Ahiran  is a village in Pindra Tehsil of Varanasi district in the Indian state of Uttar Pradesh. Ahiran falls under Nathaiya Pur gram panchayat. The village is about 10.6 kilometers North-West of Varanasi city, 282 kilometers South-East of state capital Lucknow and 805 kilometers South-East of the national capital Delhi.

Demography
Ahiran has a total population of 2,115 people amongst 293 families. Sex ratio of Ahiran is 852 and child sex ratio is 775. Uttar Pradesh state average for both ratios is 912 and 902 respectively .

Transportation
Ahiran can be accessed by road and does not have a railway station of its own. Closest railway station to this village is Shivpur railway station (2.3 kilometers North-East). Nearest operational airports are Varanasi airport (17 kilometers North-West) and Allahabad Airports (143 kilometers West).

See also

Pindra Tehsil
Pindra (Assembly constituency)

Notes
  All demographic data is based on 2011 Census of India.

References 

Villages in Varanasi district